Boone's Station may refer to a number of sites related to American frontiersman Daniel Boone (1734–1820):

 Boonesborough, Madison County, Kentucky, originally known as "Boone's Station" (1775)
 Fort Boonesborough State Park, the recreated stockade nearby
 Boone Station, Fayette County, Kentucky, known as "New Boone Station" (1776), established by Daniel's son Israel
 Boone Station State Historic Site, a Kentucky State Historic Site there
 Squire Boone's Station, Shelby County, Kentucky (1779), established by Daniel's brother Squire
 Booneville, Owsley County, Kentucky, named in Boone's honor although he did not found it

NB: Today, the Fayette County site is the most commonly referred to by this name.